Jan Ingman (born November 25, 1961 in Grums, Sweden) is a retired professional ice hockey player.

Career
During his career, he played for Grums IK between 1977–1979 and 1991-1992 and for Färjestads BK between 1979-1991. He won three Swedish Championships with Färjestads, in 1981, 1986, and 1988 . He was drafted by the Montreal Canadiens in the 1981 NHL Entry Draft, as the 19th pick overall. Though picked in the first round in the draft, he never played for the Canadiens.

Career statistics

Regular season and playoffs

International

References

1961 births
Living people
People from Grums Municipality
Swedish ice hockey left wingers
Färjestad BK players
Montreal Canadiens draft picks
National Hockey League first-round draft picks
Sportspeople from Värmland County